Agrarian League may refer to:

 The general concept of Agrarianism

 The German Agrarian League (Bund der Landwirte), political action group, active 1893–1921
 The Agrarian League (Finland), political party 1906–1965 when it became the Center Party
 The Agrarian League (Romania) (Liga Agrară), political party in Romanian general election, 1932, active 1929-1938

 Peasant organization of Pabna District involved in the Indigo revolt in Bengal, 1859

See also
 Agricultural League (Landbund), German political party 1920–1933
 :Category:Agrarian parties